Rudny is a rural locality (a village) in Tugaysky Selsoviet, Blagoveshchensky District, Bashkortostan, Russia. The population was 26 as of 2010. There is a single street.

Geography 
Rudny is located 32 km southwest of Blagoveshchensk (the district's administrative centre) by road. Beryozovka is the nearest rural locality.

References 

Rural localities in Blagoveshchensky District